Ann-Renée Desbiens (born April 10, 1994) is a Canadian ice hockey goaltender, a member of the Canadian national ice hockey team, currently affiliated with the Montreal chapter of the Professional Women's Hockey Players Association (PWHPA) and the Canadian Minister of National Defense.

She participated at the 2015 IIHF Women's World Championship, the 2018 Winter Olympics., the 2021 IIHF Women's World Championship, the 2022 Winter Olympics, and the 2022 IIHF Women's World Championship.

Playing career 

Desbiens was the first female player drafted to the Quebec Junior AAA Hockey League, the second-highest men's junior league in Québec after the QMJHL. She was selected by the Loups de La Tuque but was cut before ever playing a game because the coach didn't believe there was any point in developing girls. That same year, she participated in the Shawinigan Cataractes training camp.

She made one playoff appearance for the Montréal Stars of the Canadian Women's Hockey League (CWHL) in 2012, as the team won the Clarkson Cup.

NCAA
In 2013, she was offered a scholarship to play at the University of Wisconsin in the NCAA, despite not being fluent in English. Across four years with the Wisconsin Badgers women's ice hockey program, she led the team to four Frozen Four appearances, tallied 99 wins in 122 games, and set several individual records, including highest career save percentage (SV%), at .963, and lowest goals against average (GAA), with 0.71.

During her senior year, on November 6, 2016, Desbiens broke Noora Räty's record for most NCAA career shutouts of any gender. In a 6–0 shutout victory against the Bemidji State Beavers, Desbiens would log career shutout number 44. At the end of her senior year, Desbiens was awarded the Patty Kazmaier Award as the top female college ice hockey player in the United States.

Desbiens was the first Canadian selected at the 2016 NWHL Draft, chosen in the first round, fourth overall by the Boston Pride. As of 2021, she has not appeared with the team nor made any indication of interest in playing in the NWHL.

After the 2018 Olympics, during the 2018-19 season, Desbiens took a break from hockey, citing exhaustion and the uncertainty of options to play professionally. In May 2019, she returned to hockey by joining the PWHPA.

In the 2019–20 season, Desbiens appeared for the Fond du Lac Bears in the Great Lakes Hockey League, an elite men's amateur league. She also participated in the women's ice hockey showcase at the 2020 NHL All-Star Game, making 15 saves as the Canadian All-Stars beat the American All-Stars.

PWHPA
Standing between the pipes for Team Bauer (Montreal) in the 2021 Secret Cup, which was the Canadian leg of the 2020–21 PWHPA Dream Gap Tour, Ann-Renee Desbiens registered 19 saves in a 4-2 championship game win over Team Sonnet (Toronto).

International play 
Desbiens was selected to play for Team Canada at the 2015 IIHF Women's World Championship, where she guided Canada to a silver medal. She was also selected to play for Team Canada at the 2018 Winter Olympics, where she again won a silver medal.

On January 11, 2022, Desbiens was named to Canada's 2022 Olympic team.

Personal life 
Desbiens has a master's degree in accounting. She has named NHL goaltender Patrick Roy as a role model, her family being supporters of the Quebec Nordiques and then the Colorado Avalanche.

Awards and honours 
WCHA Player of the Week (Recognized for games of November 4–6, 2016) 
2016 WCHA Player of the Year 
WCHA Offensive Player of the Month, January 2017
WCHA Defensive Player of the Week (Week of February 14, 2017) 
2016-17 AHCA-CCM Women's University Division I All-American 
2017 Patty Kazmaier Award winner

Career statistics

Regular season and playoffs

International

Sources: EliteProspects, University of Wisconsin, Fond du Lac Bears

References

External links
 
Wisconsin bio

1994 births
Living people
French Quebecers
Canadian women's ice hockey goaltenders
Ice hockey people from Quebec
Ice hockey players at the 2018 Winter Olympics
Ice hockey players at the 2022 Winter Olympics
Medalists at the 2018 Winter Olympics
Medalists at the 2022 Winter Olympics
Olympic ice hockey players of Canada
Olympic gold medalists for Canada
Olympic silver medalists for Canada
Olympic medalists in ice hockey
Patty Kazmaier Award winners
Wisconsin Badgers women's ice hockey players
Professional Women's Hockey Players Association players
People from Capitale-Nationale